Charles Henderson may refer to:

Politicians
Charles Henderson (Alabama politician) (1860–1937), American politician, Governor of Alabama, 1915–1919
Charles Henderson (Nevada politician) (1873–1954), U.S. Senator from Nevada
Charles Henderson (Canadian politician) (1883–1957), Canadian member of Parliament
Charles P. Henderson (1911–1990), mayor of Youngstown, Ohio
Charles Henderson Yoakum (1849–1909), U.S. Representative from Texas

Scientists
Charles Richmond Henderson (1848–1915), American sociologist
Charles Roy Henderson (1911–1989), U.S. animal geneticist

Other
Charles E. Henderson (1907–1970), American songwriter and composer
Charles Henderson (historian) (1900–1933), British historian and antiquarian of Cornwall
Charles Henderson (bishop) (1924–2006), Irish-born UK Roman Catholic bishop
Charles W. Henderson (born 1948), author of books about Marine Corps sniper Carlos Hathcock and Vietnam
Charles Henderson (American football) (born 1946), former head football coach of Delaware State University
Charles Cooper Henderson (1803–1877), British painter of horses and coaches
Charles Henderson (character), fictional character in the Henderson's Boys and CHERUB series
Charles Hanford Henderson (1861–1941), American educator and author
Charles Henderson (weightlifter) (1922–2019), Australian weightlifter 
Charlie Henderson (1870–?), English footballer
Charles Henderson, organist and choirmaster of St. George's Church from 1955-?, New York City.